Mount is a surname. Notable people with the surname include:

 Anson Mount (born 1973), American actor
 Charles Mount (1928–1995), American artist
 Deiontrez Mount (born 1993), American football player
 Evelina Mount (1837–1920), American painter
 Ferdinand Mount (born 1939), British writer, novelist and columnist for The Sunday Times
 Harry Mount (born 1971), British author and journalist
 James A. Mount (1843–1901), Governor of Indiana
 Lambton L. Mount (1836–1931), Canadian-born Australian businessman
 Mason Mount (born 1999), English footballer
 Peggy Mount (1915–2001), English actress
 Pete Mount (1925–1990), American professional basketball player and father of Rick
 Rick Mount (born 1947), American professional basketball player and son of Pete
 Rita Mount (1885–1967), Canadian artist
 William Sidney Mount (1807–1868), American painter

See also
 Evadne Mount, a fictional character created by Gilbert Adair
 Mount (disambiguation)